Chapel Hill, Alabama can refer to:

Chapel Hill, Chambers County, Alabama, a place in Alabama, United States
Chapel Hill, Choctaw County, Alabama, a place in Alabama, United States
Chapel Hill, Covington County, Alabama, United States
Chapel Hill, Jefferson County, Alabama, a place in Alabama, United States
Chapel Hill, Walker County, Alabama, a place in Alabama, United States
Chapel Hill, Washington County, Alabama, a place in Alabama, United States

See also
Chapel Hill (disambiguation)